Norman Clarke (born 27 June 1960) is a Canadian basketball player. He competed in the men's tournament at the 1988 Summer Olympics.

References

External links
 

1960 births
Living people
Basketball players at the 1988 Summer Olympics
Canadian expatriate basketball people in the United States
Canadian men's basketball players
Olympic basketball players of Canada
Basketball players from Toronto
St. Bonaventure Bonnies men's basketball players